Helmut Federle (born 31 October 1944) is a Swiss painter.

Life 
Federle spent his childhood and youth in St. Margrethen close to St. Gallen in Switzerland. In 1959, he created his first small paintings with his initials HF as a motif.

From 1964, Federle studied at the School of Applied Art in Basel. In 1969 and 1971, he received a federal scholarship. In the following year, Federle travelled to Tunisia and the United States, where he studied for example the works of Mark Rothko and Agnes Martin. Together with his fellow artist and friend Martin Disler he exhibited in 1976 in the Kunstmuseum der Stadt Solothurn. Motifs at this time were mountains reduced to small triangles.

In 1979, Federle exhibited large-scaled canvases with geometric forms in the Kunsthalle Basel. The exhibition was mostly misunderstood. In 1979 and 1980, Federle lived in New York City where he was featured in the C-Space together with John M. Armleder, Olivier Mosset and Christoph Gossweiler. In 1981, the artist book New Suicide Grafic, Faces and other Pieces and in 1984 the artist book Arbeit der Neuen Ordnung (NSG II)  were published.

From 1983 to 1984, Federle lived in Zürich and held a professorship in Reykjavík. Later he moved to Vienna where he started to work with Galerie Nächst St. Stephan. In the following years, Federle was widely featured in various museum shows. In 1997, he represented Switzerland at the XLVII. Biennale in Venice. From 1999 until 2007 he held a professorship at the Kunstakademie Düsseldorf and, in 2008, he received the Prix Aurelie Nemours., in 2016 the Ricola Prize.

'Scratching Away at the Surface'  was the title of a recent exhibition in New York.

Federle lives and works in Vienna and in Camaiore, Italy.

Solo exhibitions (selection) 
2019 Kunstmuseum Basel, Switzerland
2017 Caluste Gulbenkian Museum, Lisbon, Portugal 
2013-2014 Peter Blum Gallery, New York, NY (cat.)
2012 Kunstmuseum Luzern, Lucerne, Switzerland (cat.)
2010 Galerie Nächst St. Stephan, Vienna, Austria (cat.)
2009 Peter Blum Gallery, New York, NY
2005 Rudolf Steiner Archiv / Haus Duldeck, Dornach, CH (cat.)
2004 Nietzsche-Haus, Sils-Maria, CH (cat.)
2002 Musée des Beaux-Arts de Nantes, FR (cat.)
1999 Kunsthaus Bregenz, AT (cat.)
1998 IVAM Centre Julio González, Valencia, ES (cat.)
1997 Venice Biennale, Swiss Pavilion, Venice, IT (cat.)
1995 Galerie nationale du Jeu de Paume, Paris, FR (cat.)
1995 Kunstmuseum Bonn, GER (cat.)
1993 Museum Folkwang, Essen, GER (cat.)
1993 Museum Fridericianum, Kassel, GER (cat.)
1992 Kunsthalle Zürich, CH (cat.)
1992 Moderna Museet Stockholm, Stockholm, SWE (cat.)
1991 Wiener Secession, Vienna, AT (cat.)
1989 Museum Haus Lange, Krefeld, GER;
1989 Kunsthalle Bielefeld, Bielefeld, GER;
1989 Kunstverein Hamburg, GER (cat.)
1989 Museum of Grenoble, FR (cat.)
1985 Kunstmuseum Basel, CH;
1985 Städtische Galerie Regensburg, Regensburg, GER;
1985 Haags Gemeentemuseum, Den Haag, NL (cat.)
1979 Kunsthalle Basel, CH (cat.)

Public collections (selection) 
 Albertina, Vienna, Austria
 Albright-Knox Art Gallery, Buffalo, NY
 Carnegie Museum of Art, Pittsburgh, PA
 Espace de l'art concret, Mouans-Sartoux, France
 Haags Gemeentemuseum, Den Haag, The Netherlands
 Kunsthalle Nürnberg, Germany
 Kunstmuseum Basel, Switzerland
 Kunstmuseum Bonn, Germany
 Kunstmuseum Chur, Switzerland
 Kunstmuseum Luzern, Switzerland
 Kunstmuseum St. Gallen, Switzerland
 Kunsthaus Zürich, Switzerland
 Louisiana Museum of Modern Art, Humlebaek, Denmark
 Moderna Museet, Stockholm, Sweden
 Musée d'Art Moderne, St. Etienne, France
 Museum of Grenoble, Grenoble, France
 Musée des Beaux-Arts de Nantes, France
 Musée National d'Art Moderne, Centre Pompidou, Paris, France
 Museo Nacional Centro de Arte Reina Sofia, Madrid, Spain
 Museum moderner Kunst Stiftung Ludwig, Vienna, Austria
 Museum of Modern Art, New York City, NY
 National Gallery of Australia, Canberra, Australia
 Tate Modern, London, Great Britain
 Zentrum für Kunst und Medientechnologie, Karlsruhe, Germany

Bibliography
 Bilder 1977–1978. Kunsthalle Basel, Switzerland, 1979
 New Suicide Grafic, Faces and other pieces, Zürich,  Switzerland, 1981.
 Arbeit der Neuen Ordnung (NSG II), Dudweiler, Germany, 1983.
 Zeichnungen/Drawings 1975-1984. Zürich, Switzerland, 1984
 Bilder, Zeichnungen. Basel, Switzerland, 1985
 Jedes Zeichen ein Zeichen für andere Zeichen – Zur Ästhetik von Helmut Federle. Klagenfurt, Austria, 1986
 5 + 1 New York, USA, 1990
 Helmut Federle. Wiener Secession, Vienna, Austria 1991
 Helmut Federle, XLVII Biennale Venedig. Baden, Switzerland, 1997
 Helmut Federle. Cologne, Germany 1999
 Helmut Federle. Nantes/Arles, France 2002
 Helmut Federle – Zeichnungen 1975-1997 aus Schweizer Museumsbesitz im Rudolf Steiner Archiv, Dornach. Basel, Switzerland, 2005
 Helmut Federle Vienna, Austria 2010. Catalogue (in German and English) with an essay by Roman Kurzmeyer (Self-Assertion and Abstract Form)

References
This article was initially translated from the German Wikipedia.

External links
 http://www.schwarzwaelder.at/artist/helmut_federle
 Brooklyn Rail: Helmut Federle in Conversation with John Yau and Chris Martin
 Karel Ankerman about Helmut Federle in Neue Zürcher Zeitung

20th-century Swiss painters
Swiss male painters
21st-century Swiss painters
21st-century Swiss male artists
Swiss contemporary artists
1944 births
Living people
Academic staff of Kunstakademie Düsseldorf
20th-century Swiss male artists